Amsha or Ansha is a deity in Hinduism and one of the Ādityas, - a group of celestial deities that populate the sky with their parents Kashyapa and Aditi. Amsha is a solar deity.

The Adityás 
The oldest legends specify seven or eight of these gods, but the number was later increased to twelve. Historians have suggested that perhaps the number 12 was chosen so that each solar deity related with a particular month, creating a link between each Aditya and the cycle of the year and the seasons.

Using the popular name Anśa/Aṃśa 
In India, today, many boys get a name derived from Anśa (or, Aṃśa) - for example, Anshuman (alt Amshuman) - as a sign of respect for this god.

References 

Hindu gods
Solar gods
Adityas